The Rochester Centrals were an American basketball team based in Rochester, New York that was a member of the American Basketball League.  They played at the Main Street Armory, when it was still in use as a military training facility.

Year-by-year

Basketball teams in New York (state)
Defunct basketball teams in the United States